Jules Jacquot d'Andelarre (25 October 1803, Dijon - 26 November 1885) was a French Orleanist politician. He was member of the Corps législatif from 1852 to 1870 and member of the National Assembly from 1871 to 1876.

References

1803 births
1885 deaths
Politicians from Dijon
Orléanists
Members of the 1st Corps législatif of the Second French Empire
Members of the 2nd Corps législatif of the Second French Empire
Members of the 3rd Corps législatif of the Second French Empire
Members of the 4th Corps législatif of the Second French Empire
Members of the National Assembly (1871)